The 1991–92 Latvian Hockey League season was the first season of the Latvian Hockey League, the top level of ice hockey in Latvia. Fourteen teams participated in the league, and HK Sāga Ķekava Riga won the championship.

First round

Group A

Group B

Second round

Final round

Final 
 HK Sāga Ķekava Riga – Pārdaugava Riga 8:6

Placing round

External links
 Latvian Ice Hockey Federation

Latvian Hockey League
Latvian Hockey League seasons
Latvian